Muradxanlı or Muradkhanly or Myurdkhany  refer to:
Muradxanlı, Imishli, Azerbaijan
Muradxanlı, Qubadli, Azerbaijan